The 2010 Walt Disney World Pro Soccer Classic was a preseason soccer tournament held at Walt Disney World's ESPN Wide World of Sports Complex. The tournament, the inaugural edition of the Pro Soccer Classic, was held from February 25 to 27 and featured four Major League Soccer clubs.

The tournament was won by the New York Red Bulls, who defeated Toronto FC 4–0 in the final.

Teams
The following four clubs competed in the tournament:

 New York Red Bulls from Major League Soccer (1st appearance)
 Toronto FC from Major League Soccer (1st appearance)
 FC Dallas from Major League Soccer (1st appearance)
 Houston Dynamo from Major League Soccer (1st appearance)

Matches

Semi-finals

Championship Round

Consolation match

Final

External links
 Official Site 
 WDW Pro Soccer Classic Facebook page

2010 in American soccer
2010